The Johnson Doctrine, enunciated by U.S. President Lyndon B. Johnson after the United States' intervention in the Dominican Republic in 1965, declared that domestic revolution in the Western Hemisphere would no longer be a local matter when the object is the establishment of a "Communist dictatorship". It is an extension of the Eisenhower and Kennedy Doctrines.

Background
The U.S. government disliked communist influence in the Western Hemisphere during the Cold War. In the 1960s, the Dominican Republic was a country of interest. Due to the ongoing political turmoil in the county, Dominican generals revolted in April 1965. Fearful that the members of the revolt had socialist sympathies, the U.S. invaded the country on April 28 to re-establish a government sympathetic to them.

The Doctrine
The Johnson Doctrine reinforced the United States government's existing doctrines against socialist expansion. In his May 2 address, Johnson specifically states that the American countries, will not permit the establishment of another "communist government" in the Western Hemisphere. The Johnson Doctrine builds off of the Kennedy and Eisenhower doctrines in that it opposes communism in the Western Hemisphere. It also parallels the Monroe Doctrine, with an emphasis on denouncing non-US (in this case socialist) interference in the Americas.

See also
 Doctrine
 Monroe Doctrine
 Brezhnev Doctrine

References

Further reading
 Meiertöns, Heiko (2010): The Doctrines of US Security Policy - An Evaluation under International Law, Cambridge University Press, .
 
 
 

Foreign policy doctrines of the United States
Presidency of Lyndon B. Johnson
1965 in the United States
1965 in international relations
Dominican Republic–United States relations